James Allen (born March 28, 1975) is a former American football running back in the National Football League. He played college football for Oklahoma.

College career
Allen attended the University of Oklahoma starting in 1993, and was a true freshman for the Sooners, such as rushing for 102 yards against the Texas Longhorns in a 38–17 victory. He would finish his freshman year with 788 yards rushing and one touchdown. The following year, Allen was stopped at the goal line in a loss to the Longhorns, and was later replaced by De'mond Parker in 1996, though Allen would score the game-winning touchdown that season against the Longhorns, giving the 3–8 Sooners the 30–27 win.

Professional career

Allen signed with the Chicago Bears on December 10, 1997, though he was released on August 26, 1998. He later was brought back on September 1, and placed on the Bears practice squad. Allen was the Bears starting halfback, and in 2000, he led the team with 1,120 rushing yards and two touchdowns. During the season, Allen became the first Bears player to run for 100 yards since the 1998 season when he ran for 163 yards in his first career start against the Baltimore Ravens. However, in a loss to the New York Jets, Allen fumbled three times. Allen's starting role was claimed by Anthony Thomas in 2001. Against the Cleveland Browns in Week 8, Allen caught the game-tying Hail Mary pass from Shane Matthews that was deflected towards Allen, as the Bears went on to defeat the Browns 27–21.

Allen later played for the expansion Houston Texans in the 2002 season, which was their inaugural season, and started five games for the team, splitting duties with Jonathan Wells. Allen finished second behind Wells in rushing yards for the team with 519 yards. However, in 2003, Allen retired from the NFL to become a rapper under the stage name Mersilis, saying that he "lost a little bit of that fire". Allen had skipped the Texans preseason game against the Denver Broncos due to "personal issues". Two weeks later, Allen decided to unretire, though Texans officials ruled him out of being with the team for the 2003 season, and he was released after not being claimed by any team. In his career, Allen amassed 2,497 yards and four touchdowns.

NFL career statistics

References

1975 births
Living people
People from Wynnewood, Oklahoma
American football running backs
Chicago Bears players
Houston Texans players
Oklahoma Sooners football players